Cathorops higuchii, the Higuchi's sea catfish, is a species of sea catfish. It is named after Horácio Higuchi, a scientist from Museu Paraense Emílio Goeldi, Brazil. The species is found in estuaries and coastal waters of the western Atlantic from eastern Honduras to Colón, Panama. Maximum recorded body length is 35 cm.

References

Ariidae
Fish described in 2008